Eidee Kadaida  (English: Where Am I) is a 2014 Indian Meitei language film directed by O. Gautam and produced by Bigyani Hidangmayum, under the banner of Nilahari Films. The film features Gokul Athokpam, Abenao Elangbam and Leishangthem Tonthoi in the lead roles. The movie was premiered at Manipur Film Development Corporation (MFDC), Palace Compound on 31 January 2014 and Bhagyachandra Open Air Theatre (BOAT), Imphal on 19 April 2014.

Synopsis
Life has many shades to offer. People in general live with the hope of finding the brighter shades of life. But when Lakhi's hope is constantly threatened by ill-fated events, she struggles to find her place in the society.

Cast
 Gokul Athokpam as Thoungamba
 Abenao Elangbam as Lakhi
 Leishangthem Tonthoi as Rohini, Lakhi's Mother
 Heisnam Ongbi Indu as Rohini's mother
 Venus as Tonjaoba, Lakhi's younger brother
 Idhou as Brajagopal, Lakhi's paternal uncle
 Thasana as Lakhi's friend
 Surjit Saikhom as Rohini's husband
 Baby Rainy as Baby Lakhi
 Master Ranbir Hidangmayum as Achouba, Lakhi's brother
 Pakhangba

Accolades
Baby Rainy won the Best Child Artist award at the 9th Manipur State Film Awards 2014. The film also bagged two awards at the 3rd SSS MANIFA 2014.

Soundtrack
Jeetenkumar Naorem composed the soundtrack for the film and Bachan Chongtham and Amujao Chongtham wrote the lyrics. The songs are titled Nangbu Yengjaraga Eigi Thamoise, Leikrak Chatla Kangla Leimaida and Kainare Haiba Khanglabasu.

References

External links
 

2010s Meitei-language films
2014 films